Bà Rịa-Vũng Tàu (HQ-187) is a  of the Vietnam People's Navy. She is the last of six Kilo-class submarines in service with Vietnam.

References 

Submarines of the Vietnam People's Navy
Kilo-class submarines
Attack submarines
2015 ships